Zach Heinzerling is an Academy Award-nominated and Emmy Award-winning director based in New York City. He graduated from the University of Texas in Austin with a degree in Plan II Honors and Philosophy.

Early Life 
Zach grew up in Houston, Texas. His parents were the head administrators of and also taught at the Chinquapin Preparatory School, a nonprofit private school which serves low-income youth, particularly minorities, in the Greater Houston area.

Career 
He began his career at HBO, where he worked on four consecutive Emmy Award-winning documentaries as a Producer and Cinematographer, including the Emmy Award-winning series 24/7.

Heinzerling's critically acclaimed debut feature, Cutie and the Boxer, premiered at the 2013 Sundance Film Festival where it won the Directing Award for US Documentary. Slant Magazine called it "A work of art to be cherished for capturing one of the most creative artist relationships of the past century." The film featured on many Top 10 film lists of 2013, including that of Joe Morgenstern of the Wall Street Journal and A.O. Scott from The New York Times, who called it a "powerful and beautiful visual artifact in its own right." The film went on to receive a field leading three 2014 Cinema Eye Honors, for Outstanding Debut Feature, Outstanding Original Score, and Outstanding Visual Effects. Heinzerling was awarded the Charles Guggenheim Emerging Artist award at the 2013 Full Frame Film Festival, and was the recipient of the 2013 International Documentary Association's Emerging Documentary Filmmaker Award, which recognizes the achievements of a filmmaker who has made a significant impact at the beginning of his or her career in documentary film. Cutie and the Boxer went on to be nominated for the 2014 Directors Guild of America Award for Outstanding Directorial Achievement in a Documentary, and the Academy Award for Best Documentary Feature.

Heinzerling went on to direct a five-part web series with Beyoncé Knowles-Carter entitled Self-Titled to coincide with her 2013 album Beyoncé. In 2019, he directed an episode of Dirty Money for Netflix.

Heinzerling directed the critically acclaimed 6-part series McCartney 3,2,1 starring Sir Paul McCartney and Rick Rubin which premiered on Hulu in 2021. Salon called it "quite simply, the most engaging documentary ever made about the songwriting exploits of popular music's most successful composer," while The Playlist raved "[it's] so compelling and watchable, it feels like the type of art appreciation that should be recreated with absolutely every living musical genius we still have with us that is willing. If Heinzerling and Rubin have anyone else in mind, we're all ears."

In 2023, Heinzerling's latest documentary series, Stolen Youth: Inside the Cult at Sarah Lawrence, premiered on Hulu to further acclaim.

Filmography
Films
Cutie and the Boxer (2013)
Hugh the Hunter (2015) (short film)

Series
Self-Titled  (2013)
McCartney 3,2,1 (2021)
Stolen Youth: Inside the Cult at Sarah Lawrence (2023)

One-off episodes
Dirty Money - "The Man at the Top" (2020)
Black Gold (2022)

External links

References

American documentary film directors
Living people
Year of birth missing (living people)
St. John's School (Texas) alumni
Film directors from Texas